Wild Bill is a 2011 British crime comedy drama film directed by Dexter Fletcher and starring Charlie Creed-Miles and Andy Serkis. It was released in UK cinemas on 23 March 2012.

Plot
Bill (Charlie Creed-Miles) is paroled after serving an eight year prison sentence for drug related offences. Returning to his home in East London Bill finds his two sons, 15-year-old Dean (Will Poulter) and 11-year-old Jimmy (Sammy Williams) abandoned by their mother, Dean having dropped out of school to work and take care of Jimmy on his own. Dean makes it clear to Bill that he is not welcome in either his or Jimmy's lives. Bill's former criminal associates Dickie (Neil Maskell) and Terry (Leo Gregory) offer Bill some drug dealing. Bill is on license and refuses, not wanting to return to prison. Bill instead intends to go to Scotland and work on the oil rigs. During a parole meeting Bill finds out that his sons, under aged and without a legal guardian will be surrendered to foster care. Reluctant to be a father to Dean and Jimmy, Bill still insists on going to Scotland; Dean reveals that he has confiscated his drugs and threatens to tell the police if Bill doesn't remain.

Despite the number of challenges ahead of him, such as finding suitable work as well as Jimmy's delinquent behaviour, Bill is able to find legal work and bond with Jimmy. Drug lord Glen (Andy Serkis) who Bill went to prison for, is unnerved by Bill's insistence on going straight and being in his territory; believing his behaviour will upset his business arrangements. Jimmy's delinquency and tendency to abscond from school to be a drug mule for Pill (Iwan Rheon), also an employee of Glen's brother Terry, threatens to undo Bill's progress. One evening, Jimmy is nearly caught and arrested for possessing a large amount of cocaine. Jimmy disposes of the drugs to avoid arrest but this puts him in a bad position with Terry. Dean visits his love interest Steph (Charlotte Spencer) where the two nearly have sex before her father unexpectedly comes home. Jimmy, who had followed Dean to Steph's home, notices a large amount of cash in the house and steals it to pay off Terry, though the amount stolen isn't nearly enough. Terry demands Jimmy work off the remaining balance, threatening to burn down his flat if he doesn't.

When Steph recognizes the theft she immediately blames Dean for it, who in turn surmises that it was Jimmy. Roxy (Liz White) who is one of Terry's prostitutes confides in Bill that Jimmy is working for Terry. After a lengthy search for Jimmy, Bill corners and confronts his son and promises him that he will end up in prison just like his father if he continues down the path he is on. Bill returns to Steph's home with the stolen money, who in turn returns to make amends and reconcile with Dean. Terry demands that Bill meet him at a local pub; Bill rationalising that in returning the drugs Jimmy had on him he can release Jimmy from Terry's control. Terry has other intentions, including never releasing Jimmy from his obligations as well as killing Bill for his reluctance to leave. Bill easily dispatches Terry and his goons, many of whom abandon him in the face of "Wild Bill".

Returning home with Jimmy, Bill is intercepted by Glen. Bill reaffirms his commitment to his honest and law abiding life, though his earlier fight obviously violates his conditions of parole. Knowing he will be sent back to prison, Dean, Roxy, Steph and Jimmy see him off; Dean promising that he is welcome back when he returns. Inside the police car, Bill asks the officer if he has children as he wells up. Bill then begins to smile and laugh, remaining optimistic about his eventual return this time.

Cast
 Charlie Creed-Miles as Wild Bill
 Will Poulter as Dean
 Sammy Williams as Jimmy
 Iwan Rheon as Pill
 Charlotte Spencer as Steph
 Morgan Watkins as Viktoras
 Rad Kaim as Jonas
 Aaron Ishmael as Boz
 Liz White as Roxy
 Hardeep Singh Kohli as Raj
 Neil Maskell as Dickie
 Leo Gregory as Terry
 Mark Monero as Freddy
 Peter-Hugo Daly as Keith
 Olivia Williams as Kelly
 Jaime Winstone as Helen 
 Elly Fairman as Miss Treedley
 Andy Serkis as Glen
 Graham Fletcher-Cook as Policeman
 Sean Pertwee as Jack (Policeman) 
 Lee Whitlock as Boss
 Billy Holland as Mini Hoodie
 Dexter Fletcher as Mysterious Barry

Production
The film was shot primarily in the East End of London. Fletcher cites directors such as Emir Kusturica, Franklin Schaffner, Gerard Johnson  and films like Black Cat, White Cat, Tony and Underground as influences.

Reception
Wild Bill holds a 100% rating on review site Rotten Tomatoes, based on 26 reviews, with an average rating of 7.6/10.

References

External links
 
 
 Screen Daily

2011 films
British prison drama films
Films set in London
Films directed by Dexter Fletcher
2011 directorial debut films
2010s prison drama films
2010s English-language films
2010s British films